Fuuse is an independent music, arts and film production company founded by Norwegian artist, (film and music maker) Deeyah Khan. 
Fuuse is an Emmy and Peabody award winning company based in Norway and specialises in creating music and film projects rooted in art, culture and activism to encourage dialogue around social and political issues.

The debut film created and produced by Fuuse was the 2012 critically acclaimed and award winning documentary Banaz A Love Story.

Fuuse consists of film, music and live event activities made through Fuuse Mousiqi, Fuuse Films and Fuuse Live.

Advocacies

Fuuse has core advocacies: human rights, gender equality, freedom of expression, love, social justice and peace.  Each Fuuse project highlights a specific advocacy.

Fuuse Mosiqi

Fuuse Mosiqi is the music division of Fuuse and works for cultural exchange through music.  Its two ongoing core music series are WOMAN, which presents the voices and music of women artists in celebration of world music. The second is the FUUSE MOUSIQI Traditional Music Heritage Preservation series.

CDs released through Fuuse Mosiqi

 Nordic Woman.
 Iranian Woman
 Echoes Of Indus   (Ashraf Sharif Khan Poonchwala)

Fuuse films
 2020: Muslim in Trump’s America
 2020: America's War on Abortion
 2017: White Right: Meeting The Enemy
 2016: Islam's Non-Believers
 2015: Jihad: A Story of the Others
 2012: Banaz: A Love Story

Fuuse Live

 Fuuse presents World Woman 
 Banaz A Love Story screening and conversation event in Oslo hosted in collaboration with Fritt Ord January 2013.

Banaz A Love Story screening and conversation event in London hosted in collaboration with Free Word Centre and Article19 March 2013.

References

External links 
 Fuuse Official Website

Culture in Oslo
Entertainment companies established in 2010
2010 establishments in Norway
Film production companies of Norway
Film production companies of the United Kingdom
Film production companies of the United States
Companies based in Oslo
Companies based in London
Companies based in Boston